The 4th Circuit de Cadours was a Formula Two motor race held on 14 September 1952 at the Circuit de Cadours, in Cadours, Tarn-et-Garonne, France. The race, consisting of 2x15 lap heats and a 30 lap final, was won by Louis Rosier in a Ferrari 500. Harry Schell finished second in a Gordini Type 16, and set fastest lap, and Emmanuel de Graffenried was third in a Maserati 4CLT/48.

Classification

Race

References

Cadours
Cadours